Orimattila is a town in Päijänne Tavastia region, Finland. The southern part of Lahti is connected to the village of Orimattila, which is located in the region of Pennala. There are also several municipalities in the area, such as Iitti, Kärkölä, Lahti, Mäntsälä, and Pukkila.

Its area of land is 28.87 square kilometers, which is filled with water. The municipality is also unilingually Finnish. Its per-capita population is around 20.14.

The subject of the coat of arms of Orimattila, "a stallion horse carrying a scythe", refers to both the name of the municipality and local agriculture. The name itself comes from a house called Orhimattila, hosted by Henrich Mattzsson Orhimattila, which was already written in a 1573 book of judgment. The coat of arms was designed by Ahti Hammar and approved by the Orimattila Municipal Council at its meeting on September 15, 1956. The Ministry of the Interior approved the use of the coat of arms on December 17 of the same year.

Results of the 2021 Finnish municipal elections, resulted in the True Finns being the largest group on Orimattila council, in Orimattila.

History
The area of Orimattila contains Finland's oldest known settlement.

Orimattila gets its name from a local farm, established by Matti Laurinpoika in 1539. His estate was known as Orih-Mattila. As a village, Orimattila was first mentioned in 1561 as Orihmattila. A chapel community was established in the late 1500s, and it became an independent parish after it was separated from the neighboring parish of Hollola in 1636. The parish and its main settlement were still known as Orihmattila until the 19th century. Orih is an older pronunciation of the word ori meaning "stallion", though the loss of the h in place names was prevented by the element after it, in this case -mattila (cf. Orivesi, also called Orihvesi until the 19th century).

During the Great Northern War, which was caused by the Russian occupation of Finland, the parishes of Orimattila and Hollola were temporarily united. The following year, the bishop of Orimattila was forced to collect taxes from the neighboring parish of Hollola, which was then taken over by the bishop of Stockholm. 

Many immigrants from the Kirvu region were settled in Orimattila as a result of the Continuation War. Orimattila became a town in 1992. In 2009, the municipality decided not to participate in the merger negotiations between the municipalities of Artjärvi and Orimattila, and on March 22, 2010, the two municipalities merged.

Population trends

The following diagram shows the city's population development over the past five years. The region where the city is located is used according to the situation on January 1, 2017.

Famous people
Culture
Selma Anttila, Writer
Roni Back, YouTuber
Miklu, Ex-YouTuber, Musician, Writer
Kaj Chydenius, a composer, is staying in the village
Eero Erkko, Member of Parliament 1907–1918, newspaperman
J. H. Erkko, poet
Eki Jantunen, musician
Aki Kaurismäki, film director
Mika Kaurismäki, film director
Jukka Lehtinen, sculptor
Paavo Melander, composer/lyricist
Pentti Papinaho, sculptor
Annika Siltaniemi, Tenavatähti winner
Helmi Vuorelma, founder of the weaving company  
Athletes
Taito Haara, power and weight lifter
Kristiina Mäkelä, triple jumper
Satu Mäkelä-Nummela, Olympic shooting gold medalist (women's trap)  
Jaakko Tuominen, hurdler
Other famous people
Yvonne de Bruyn, Miss Finland
Vesa-Matti Peltola, sports expert
Oskari Rajanen, sales advisor

Twin towns — Sister cities
Orimattila is twinned with:

  Weißenburg-Gunzenhausen, Germany
  Östhammar, Sweden  
  Jõgeva, Estonia
 Valka, Latvia

See also
 Artjärvi
 Myrskylä
 Pukkila

References

External links

Municipality of Orimattila – Official website, finnish, swedish, english, german and russian

 
Cities and towns in Finland
Populated places established in 1636
1636 establishments in Sweden